Rodoljub "Roćko" Čolaković (7 June 1900 – 30 March 1983) was a Yugoslav politician and writer who served as the 1st Prime Minister of PR Bosnia and Herzegovina and as the Minister for PR Bosnia and Herzegovina in the Provisional Government of DF Yugoslavia led by Josip Broz Tito. He was a major general in the Yugoslav People's Army and in the National Liberation Army during World War II.

Biography
Born in Bijeljina, Bosnia and Herzegovina, Austria-Hungary on 7 June 1900, Čolaković joined the League of Communists of Yugoslavia in April 1919 as a student. Later, he joined Crvena Pravda ("Red Justice"), a left-wing terrorist organisation which assassinated Yugoslav interior minister Milorad Drašković on 21 July 1921. For his role in the assassination, Čolaković was sentenced to 12 years in prison. While serving his sentence, he made friends with many notable Yugoslav communists, including Moša Pijade with whom he translated Das Kapital and other seminal Marxist texts into Serbo-Croatian.

After his release, Čolaković emigrated to the Soviet Union and in 1937 travelled to Spain to take part in the Spanish Civil War on the Republican side. He later came back to Yugoslavia, participating in World War II. Between 1946 and 1955, Čolaković published five volumes of Zapisa iz oslobodilačkog rata ("Memoir of the liberation war") from his war diaries. In addition to writing newspaper articles, propaganda leaflets and books on World War II, he also published two autobiographies Kuća oplakana ("House of Mourning") and Kazivanje o jednom pokolenju ("Stories of One Generation). Čolaković died on 30 March 1983 at the age of 82 in Belgrade.

Awards and decorations

Domestic awards
After World War II, Čolaković was awarded many high profile Yugoslav orders, the biggest one of them being the Order of the People's Hero, which he was awarded on 27 November 1953.

Foreign awards
Čolaković was also awarded two foreign orders; the Polish Order of Polonia Restituta and the Soviet Order of Kutuzov.

References

External links

1900 births
1983 deaths
People from Bijeljina
People from the Condominium of Bosnia and Herzegovina
Serbs of Bosnia and Herzegovina
League of Communists of Bosnia and Herzegovina politicians
Yugoslav Partisans members
Bosnia and Herzegovina people of World War II
International Lenin School alumni
Members of the Academy of Sciences and Arts of Bosnia and Herzegovina
Recipients of the Order of the People's Hero